Murad Arif oghlu Shukur (born 27 September 1981) is an Azerbaijani singer, composer, record producer, showman, and journalist. The Azerbaijanian press has described him as "Hitmaker". He is the author and presenter of YouTube project "Popumuz Var!". He was chosen as a coach in the international project "The Voice".

Biography 
Murad Arif was born on 27 September 1981 in Sumgait. His father is originally from Fuzuli, and his mother is originally from Shusha. He has two sisters. He is the brother of TV presenter Konul Arifgizi. Murad received his secondary education in Sumgait. He is a graduate of the International Economic Relations faculty. He has two children: his son was born in 2014 and his daughter was born in 2015.

Television career 
In 2002, Murad worked for Radio Space 104 FM. Later, he worked in Lider Jazz FM, Public radio & Day.AZ radio as DJ. His first television show was broadcast on ITV, in 2006 with Husniya Maharramova, named "Qaraj". In 2007, Murad won famous Azerbaijani competition "Mashin show". He was the presenter of "Yeni Sahar", "Solo" in Lider TV and "Gun kechir" in ATV. In 2010 he was commentator of the opening ceremony of World Football Championship. He was commentator of the international music competition "5 Звезд". In 2014, he was one of the judges of "Böyük səhnə", and he was the one of the supporters of Dilara Kazimova, who won the 2014 edition of Boyuk Sehne. He is also the host of one of its kind Youtube show "Popumuz Var!". Arif commentated for Azerbaijan at the Eurovision Song Contest in 2006, 2019, 2021, and 2022.

Music career 
For a long time, Murad was the record producer of Ayaz Gasimov, Khayyam Nisanov, Yashar Jalilov and Elton Huseynaliyev. He presented "Almalarinla" in 2008 with Ayaz Gasimov. In 2009, his song "Sevdiyini söylə" won the competition "Bakı Gecələri" which was organised by Ministry of Culture. The song was performed by Intizar and Natavan Habibi. In 2011, singer Natavan Habibi, sung the song "Təyyarələr" which was composed and written by Murad Arif in the «Turkcevizyon Muzik Festivali 2011» the festival of the Turkish speaking countries, competition which was held in Denizli, Turkey.

In 2018 Murad performed a solo concert in the Centre of Heydar Aliyev. In 2019, he held another concert in the same location. In 2019, 5 September, Murad Arif had concert "Tufan" in the biggest club of the country "Electra Hall". In 2020, Murad is being selected as the coach of the international project "The Voice Kids".

Discography

Songs

Singles

Albums 
 Solo

References

External links 
 Instagram account

21st-century Azerbaijani male singers
Azerbaijani composers
Living people
1981 births
People from Sumgait